Amata nigriceps  is a species of moth of the family Erebidae first described by Arthur Gardiner Butler in 1876. It is found in Australia, where it has been recorded from Queensland and New South Wales.

References 

nigriceps
Moths described in 1876
Moths of Australia